Shri Gauri Shanker Pandey (गौरी शंकर पाण्डेय), was a veteran Indian politician and a former Minister of Bihar. He represented Bettiah constituency in Bihar assembly and served in various ministerial portfolios.

He was a popular leader of Congress from Bihar and even leaders from opposition party respected him for his social services, simplicity and honesty. After retiring from active politics, he remained in his home village Baithania (near Bettiah) for the rest of his life serving the people.

Member of Legislative Assembly, Bihar 
He had been a member of Bihar Legislative Assembly during 1969-72, 1977–82, 1982–85, 1985-90 Bettiah (Vidhan Sabha constituency), Bihar. He has held several ministerial portfolios including Road, Transport, Civil Aviation, Law, Excise, Environment and forest in successive Bihar Governments.

Also see
List of politicians from Bihar

References

Sources

 
 
 
 
 
 
 
 

Members of the Bihar Legislative Assembly
People from Bihar
Banaras Hindu University alumni
Indian National Congress politicians
People from Bettiah
1935 births
Living people
Bihari politicians